HK Dniprovski Vovky or HK Dneprovskie Volki Dnepropetrovsk was an ice hockey team in Dnipropetrovsk, Ukraine. They played in the Ukrainian Hockey League, the top level of ice hockey in Ukraine. Their last appearance in the league came during the 2008-09 season.

The team was founded in 2002 as HK Meteor Dnepropetrovsk, and took on their current name in 2004.

External links
Team profile on eurohockey.com
Official website

Ice hockey teams in Ukraine
Sport in Dnipro